"Hollywood Swinging" is a 1974 song by R&B/funk band Kool & the Gang from their album Wild and Peaceful. It was written by Robert "Kool" Bell, Ronald Bell, George M. Brown, Robert "Spike" Mickens, Claydes Charles Smith, Dennis R. Thomas and Rick A. Westfield.

"Hollywood Swinging" was the group's first number one R&B single, reaching that position in June 1974.  The single was a successful crossover hit, peaking at number 6 on the Billboard Hot 100 singles chart as well.

In a 2015 interview Nile Rodgers stated that Chic's 1979 song "Good Times" was partly inspired by "Hollywood Swinging". Rodgers also stated he is the cousin of Robert Mickens.

Track listing

De-Lite Records – DE-561:

Critical reception
Record World said "These guys have to be funk personified. Make way for their next million seller."

Daryl Easlea of the BBC wrote "Hollywood Swinging packs appropriate punch".
Andrew Hamilton of Allmusic called Hollywood Swinging "a slightly faster than mid-tempo song with whistles, festive ambiance and lead vocals by keyboardist Ricky West."

Charts

Certifications

Notable appearances in other media
"Hollywood Swinging" appears in the game Grand Theft Auto: San Andreas as well as the game's soundtrack during the dance sequences in the mission "Life's a Beach". It also appears in the Academy Award-winning documentary O.J.: Made in America in a montage detailing Simpson's rise to fame in the late 1970s.

Covers and samples
The song has been sampled in several rap songs, including:
 "Let Me Clear My Throat" by DJ Kool
 "Another Slob Bites the Dust" by Bloods & Crips
 "Compton Swangin'" by B.G. Knocc Out & Dresta
 "Feel So Good" by Mase
 "Money in the Ghetto" by Too $hort
 "Inglewood Swangin'" by Mack 10
 "Got 2 Go" by Redhead Kingpin featuring Kwame
 "Bag of Glue" by the Rubberbandits
 "2 Step" by 2 Chainz

Brian Culbertson featuring Musiq Soulchild and Gerald Albright covered "Hollywood Swinging" on Culbertson's 2008 album Bringing Back the Funk. In 1982 the Big Boys released the Fun, Fun, Fun... EP containing a cover of "Hollywood Swinging".

The group Brockhampton covered "Hollywood Swinging" in 2022 for the soundtrack of the animated film Minions: The Rise of Gru, which consisted primarily of contemporary artists covering 1970s music.

Jamiroquai versions

A version of "Hollywood Swinging" was originally recorded by British funk/acid jazz band Jamiroquai in 1997. The group released the recording, alongside three other tracks, on an exclusive Japanese MiniDisc entitled "Hollywood Swinging", which was available from November 6, 1997. This version also appeared on the group's compilation album, In Store Jam, which was only available for purchase in the US. In 2004, Kool & the Gang re-recorded "Hollywood Swinging" as a collaboration with the group, releasing it on December 8, 2005, having recorded it in 2004. The song was released as a single from their album of re-recorded songs, The Hits: Reloaded, and was released on several different formats. Despite strong radio airplay, the song failed to chart anywhere.

Track listing

1997
Japanese mini single
 "Virtual Insanity" (Radio Edit) – 3:54
 "When You Gonna Learn" (Didgeridoo) – 3:48
 "Too Young to Die" (Radio Edit) – 3:19
 "Hollywood Swinging" – 4:47

2005
Spanish CD single
 "Hollywood Swinging" (feat. Jamiroquai) – 4:28

European CD single
 "Hollywood Swinging" (feat. Jamiroquai) (Ralphi Rosario's Old School Vocal) – 7:30
 "Hollywood Swinging" (feat. Jamiroquai) (Ralphi Rosario's Hollywood Rock Dub) – 9:10

UK CD single
 "Hollywood Swinging" (feat. Jamiroquai) – 4:28
 "Cherish" (feat. Ashanti)
 "Get Down on It" (feat. Blue & Lil' Kim)
 "Ladies Night" (feat. Sean Paul & Spanner Banner)

UK 12" vinyl
 "Hollywood Swinging" (feat. Jamiroquai) – 4:28
 "Hollywood Swinging" (feat. Jamiroquai) (Ralphi Rosario's Old School Vocal) – 7:30
 "Hollywood Swinging" (feat. Jamiroquai) (Ralphi Rosario's Hollywood Rock Dub) – 9:10

References

Songs about Los Angeles
1974 singles
Funk songs
Kool & the Gang songs
1973 songs
De-Lite Records singles
Edel AG singles
Songs written by Claydes Charles Smith
Songs written by Ronald Bell (musician)
Songs written by Robert "Kool" Bell